is a Japanese voice actress, scriptwriter and voice drama producer, whose main works are voice dramas recorded using binaural recording methods. She also performs in various bishōjo games as a voice actress.

Biography
She is the founder of the dōjin circle "" and its sister circle "". She is also the founder, producer, director, scriptwriter, and audio engineer of the bishōjo game brand "".

Igasaki used to work in an (耳かき専門店) in Tokyo for several years. She is described as a perfectionist. This aspect of her personality is seen in her works, especially in audio recording and editing.

"Igasaki" is her stage name, which comes from a character in the anime Nintama Rantarō .

List of Voice Performances

Radio Personality

Discography

References

Footnotes

Sources

External links
  

Year of birth missing (living people)
Living people
Japanese voice actresses
21st-century Japanese actresses